Subotnick and Subotnik can refer to:

Surname
Daniel Subotnik (born 1942), American law professor
Morton Subotnick (born 1933), American composer of electronic music
Rose Rosengard Subotnik (born 1942), American musicologist
Steven Subotnick (fl. 1980s–2010s), animator and animation teacher
Stuart Subotnick (born 1942), American businessman

Places
The Subotnick Financial Center at Baruch College

See also 
Subbotnik (disambiguation)